Montrose Works F.C. was an English association football club based in Sheffield, South Yorkshire.

History
Montrose Works F.C. was the works football team of William Lee & Sons Limited who were malleable iron founders and machinists, manufacturing parts principally for the agricultural industry at their Montrose Works factory in Harwood Street, Sheffield, just a few yards away from the Bramall Lane ground of Sheffield United.

The business was originally established in 1860 and there was a Montrose Works cricket team by 1885. The football club was formed in 1888 but had some difficulty in finding a home ground until securing a lease on a field formerly used by Caledonian F.C. at the Olive Grove.
Montrose Works F.C. joined the Sheffield & District League in 1890 but finished bottom of the table and resigned at the end of the season as they were unable to find a ground for the 1891–92 season.

After being dormant for a few years, Montrose Works joined both the Hatchard Cup and the Sheffield & Hallamshire Minor Cup in 1895 by which time they were playing home games at Millhouses. The latter competition had two stages with the successful clubs from the first stage qualifying for the second stage. Montrose Works qualified for the second stage by finishing second in their section but then withdrew from the competition.

In 1896–97, Montrose Works won their division of the Hatchard Cup and reached the final played at Woodhouse, South Yorkshire where they lost 3–0 to Kimberworth.

In 1897–98, Montrose Works won the Hatchard Cup, beating Eastwood Mission 6–1 in the final at Carbrook.

In 1898, the club opened a new ground at Norton where there was a stand that could accommodate 300 people and there were dressing rooms for both the players and match officials.

In 1899–1900, Montrose Works moved up to the Sheffield Association League and finished 4th out of 9 in Division Two and then 10th out of 15 in the single division in 1900–01.

Montrose Works entered the F.A. Cup in both 1899-1900 and 1900-01 but were eliminated in their opening tie in both seasons.

In 1901, William Lee & Sons moved their business from Sheffield to Dronfield and Montrose Works F.C. closed down.

League and cup history

Records
Hatchard Cup winners 1897–98.

References

Defunct football clubs in England
Defunct football clubs in South Yorkshire
Hatchard League
Sheffield Association League
Sheffield & District Football League
Works association football teams in England